Mustamakkara is a type of Finnish blood sausage traditionally eaten with lingonberry jam. It is available in many stores across Finland, but is considered a specialty of Tampere, Pirkanmaa. Mustamakkara is at its best when bought and eaten fresh at market stalls, to which it is delivered in styrofoam boxes straight from the factories, still piping hot. A typical practice of reheating the sausage is to fry it in a pan.

Mustamakkara is known to have been eaten as early as the 17th century and was generally cooked over a small fire, in a hot cauldron, or in an oven. Mustamakkara is made by mixing ground pork, pig blood, crushed rye and flour, after which it is stuffed into a casing of intestine. The two major producers of this food are Tapola and Savupojat.

When buying mustamakkara in the Tampere region, it is customary to specify the worth of sausage one wishes to buy, instead of the weight, length or number of the pieces, e.g. "Five euros' worth of black sausage, please". Often people simply point at their preferred piece. The shape and moisture of mustamakkara varies, and by this method, the buyer can get their preferred piece. Also common is to indicate purchase of a complete sausage by requesting a "round trip", menopaluu, which refers to its U-shape. A traditional location for enjoying mustamakkara is Tammelantori square in the district of Tammela.

On his show, Anthony Bourdain: No Reservations, celebrity chef Anthony Bourdain praised mustamakkara, calling it "Good stuff!" Mustamakkara is generally an acquired taste in Finland.

See also 
 Ryynimakkara

References

External links 

Finnish sausages
Blood sausages